A Welsh Singer is a 1915 British silent drama film directed by Henry Edwards and starring Edwards, Campbell Gullan and Florence Turner. It was based on the 1896 novel of the same name by Allen Raine. The screenplay concerns a shepherd who falls in love with a girl.

Premise
A Welsh shepherd falls in love with a local girl Myfanwy. However they both become separated through their careers, as he becomes a sculptor and she a leading opera singer.

Cast
 Florence Turner – Myfanwy
 Henry Edwards – Leuan
 Campbell Gullan – Tom Pomfrey
 Malcolm Cherry – John Powys
 Una Venning – Laissabeth Powys
 Fred Rains – Music Master
 Edith Evans – Mrs. Pomfrey

References

External links

1916 films
British silent feature films
1916 drama films
Films directed by Henry Edwards
Films based on British novels
British drama films
British black-and-white films
1910s English-language films
1910s British films
Silent drama films